Jim Haddock is a Democratic member of the Pennsylvania House of Representatives, representing the 26th District since 2023.

Career 
Haddock served as the clerk of courts and prothonotary manager in Luzerne County for 10 years.

External links

References 

Living people
Democratic Party members of the Pennsylvania House of Representatives
Bucknell University alumni
Politicians from Luzerne County, Pennsylvania
21st-century American politicians